George William Barnard (2 February 1804 – 1827) was an English amateur cricketer who played twice in first-class cricket matches for Cambridge University Cricket Club during the 1820s. He died at Cambridge before he graduated.

Life
Barnard was born at Harefield in Middlesex in 1804, the son of the Edward and Mary Ann Barnard (née Beadon). His father served in the West Kent troop of the Yeomanry Cavalry at Chislehurst from their formation in 1793 before being ordained in the Church of England in 1797; he was appointed to Harefield parish in 1803, and the family lived there until 1807. Barnard's grandfather, also Edward, was a clergyman who had been a fellow of St John's College, Cambridge and was the Headmaster of Eton College between 1754 and 1765 and the College Provost from 1765 until his death in 1781. Barnard's mother Mary Ann was the daughter of Edward Beadon, the vicar of St Nicolas Church, North Stoneham in Hampshire. She married his father, who had also attended St John's, in 1784.

Along with his three brothers, Barnard was educated at Eton. He was Captain of Montem in 1823 and captained the college cricket team in 1822 and 1823, playing both years in the Eton v Harrow match at Lord's. He went up to King's College, Cambridge in 1823 as a scholar and was elected as a Fellow of the college in 1826. He died at Cambridge in 1827 without graduating.

Cricket
Both of Barnard's first-class cricket matches were played for Cambridge University against the Cambridge Town Club, the first in 1825 and the second in 1826. He scored a total of 77 runs with a highest score of 51. He played other matches for the university against Bury St Edmunds, at the time a strong side, and is known to have played for a side organised by William Deedes at Sevenoaks Vine in 1823.

Two of Barnard's brothers also played first-class cricket. Henry Watson Barnard, who was a clergyman, played in five first-class matches between 1815 and 1823 and John Barnard played 18 matches between 1815 and 1830 and was President of MCC in 1829. All three of his brothers also attended Cambridge, Charles and Henry attending St John's College, whilst John was a Fellow at King's from 1817 until his death in 1878.

Notes

References

External links

English cricketers
English cricketers of 1787 to 1825
Cambridge University cricketers
1804 births
1827 deaths
People educated at Eton College
Alumni of King's College, Cambridge